is a Japanese football player who currently plays for J1 League club Yokohama F. Marinos.

Career

Club career 
Saneto spent his early years playing for Kochi University. Kawasaki Frontale announced Saneto's transfer from Kochi University on 12 May 2010, marking the start of his professional career. He spent the rest of the 2010 J.League Division 1 season without playing a single minute.

In the 2011 season, Saneto appeared in a total of 13 games, 12 in the league and 1 in the J.League Cup for Kawasaki Frontale. He became a regular the next year, making a total of 32 appearances in all competitions while also scored two goals for the club. However, his playing time decreased after the 2012 season, quite significantly in the 2014 season where he only made 13 appearances for the club. Saneto missed most of the 2015 J.League 1 season, as he only played for 4 minutes throughout the whole year.

At the start of 2016, it was announced that after five-and-a-half years of playing for Kawasaki Frontale, Saneto transferred to newly promoted Avispa Fukuoka.

Career statistics

Club
Updated to end of 2020 season.

Honours

Japan
Asian Games: 2010

Club
Yokohama F. Marinos
 J1 League: 2022

References

External links
Profile at Avispa Fukuoka
j-league

1989 births
Living people
Kochi University alumni
Association football people from Tokushima Prefecture
Japanese footballers
J1 League players
J2 League players
Kawasaki Frontale players
Avispa Fukuoka players
Asian Games medalists in football
Footballers at the 2010 Asian Games
Association football defenders
Asian Games gold medalists for Japan
Medalists at the 2010 Asian Games